This is a list of lighthouses in Oman.

Lighthouses

See also
 Lists of lighthouses and lightvessels

References

External links

 

Oman
Lighthouses
Lighthouses